William Moore Davis (May 22, 1829 – March 26, 1920)  was an American painter best known for his landscapes.  A native of Long Island, he spent most of his life near Port Jefferson and has been praised as the greatest painter of that village. A contemporary of the Hudson River School, he was greatly influenced by fellow local painter William Sidney Mount.

Biography

William Moore Davis was born in Setauket, Long Island, New York, on May 22, 1829.  As a boy, Davis worked in the shipbuilding industry of Port Jefferson before turning to painting full-time.  Aside from a handful of years living in New York City, Moore spent his entire life in the Northwestern Brookhaven area of Long Island.  He was strongly influenced by his friend and fellow painter William Sidney Mount, also of Setauket origins.  Moore died on March 26, 1920, and was buried in the Sea View Cemetery in Mount Sinai, NY.

Davis had few exhibitions during his life but was rediscovered for a 1973 display in Port Jefferson and a 2002 exhibition at the Long Island Museum in Stony Brook

Gallery

References

1829 births
1920 deaths
19th-century American painters
American male painters
American genre painters
American landscape painters
Luminism (American art style)
Hudson River School painters
People from Setauket, New York
People from Port Jefferson, New York
People from Mount Sinai, New York
20th-century American painters
19th-century American male artists
20th-century American male artists